Vahab Saalabi is a paralympic athlete from Iran competing mainly in category F42 javelin events.

Vahab has competed at two paralympics first in 2000 and then again in 2004 on both occasions he won the bronze medal in the F42 javelin.

References

External links
 

Year of birth missing (living people)
Living people
Paralympic athletes of Iran
Paralympic bronze medalists for Iran
Paralympic medalists in athletics (track and field)
Athletes (track and field) at the 2000 Summer Paralympics
Athletes (track and field) at the 2004 Summer Paralympics
Medalists at the 2000 Summer Paralympics
Medalists at the 2004 Summer Paralympics
Iranian male javelin throwers
Javelin throwers with limb difference
Paralympic javelin throwers
21st-century Iranian people